The 2010 Tandridge District Council election took place on 6 May 2010 to elect members of Tandridge District Council in Surrey, England. One third of the council was up for election and the Conservative Party stayed in overall control of the council.

After the election, the composition of the council was:
Conservative 33
Liberal Democrat 8
Independent 1

Background
14 of the seats on the council were up for election, with both the Conservatives and Liberal Democrats contesting every seat. 3 Conservative councillors stood down at the election, Eric Morgan from Limpsfield ward, Matthew Groves from Queens Park ward and Ros Langham from Westway ward. Meanwhile, in Burstow, Horne and Outwood ward, the sitting Conservative councillor, Peter Brown, stood as an independent after being deselected and in Whyteleafe Sakina Bradbury defended the seat for the Conservatives after defecting from the Liberal Democrats in 2008. Other parties standing at the election included the UK Independence Party, Labour Party with 8 candidates and the Green Party with 2 candidates.

Election result
The Conservatives remained in control of the council after holding 13 of the 14 seats contested to have 33 seats on the council. No seats changed hands with the Conservatives holding Westway by 29 votes, Queens Park by 37 votes and Whyteleafe by 151 votes. The Conservatives also comfortably held Burstow, Horne and Outwood, despite the challenge from the independent candidate and outgoing Conservative councillor Peter Brown. Meanwhile, the Liberal Democrats won the only seat not held by the Conservatives in Warlingham East, Chelsham and Farleigh by 71 votes to remain on 8 councillors. Overall turnout at the election was 71.63%.

Ward results

References

2010
2010 English local elections
May 2010 events in the United Kingdom
2010s in Surrey